Chris Tontz (born October 27, 1973) is an American tennis coach and former professional player.

Baltimore-born Tontz grew up in San Diego, as one of 10 siblings. He played collegiate tennis for UC Irvine before pursuing a professional career in the late 1990s. Most successful in doubles, he had two ATP Tour main draw appearances and won a Challenger tournament in Grenoble in 1999, reaching a best ranking of 162. As a coach he has worked with Sloane Stephens and currently coaches Claire Liu.

Challenger/Futures titles

Doubles

References

External links
 
 

1973 births
Living people
American male tennis players
Tennis people from California
UC Irvine Anteaters men's tennis players
Tennis players from San Diego